Rongmei Naga may refer to:
 Rongmei Naga people 
 Rongmei people
 Rongmei Naga language 
 Rongmei language